C. laevigata  may refer to:
Carex laevigata, a European sedge
Celtis laevigata, sugarberry or southern hackberry, a North American tree
Cephalaria laevigata, a species in the genus Cephalaria
Chaenotheca laevigata, a species in the lichen genus Chaenotheca
Clidemia laevigata, a species of Clidemia (glory bush, Melastomataceae)
Crataegus laevigata (often misspelled C. levigata), the Midland hawthorn or woodland hawthorn, a tree species
Cryptocarya laevigata, the glossy laurel, a rainforest plant species

Synonyms
Cassia laevigata (disambiguation)